Jair Benítez Sinisterra (born 11 January 1979) is a Colombian footballer.

Career

Professional 

Benítez has spent the majority of his career playing professionally in Colombia, having played 344 games and scoring 19 goals in Colombia's Fútbol Profesional Colombiano. He won a Fútbol Profesional Colombiano title with Independiente Medellín in 2002, and appeared in 17 regular season and Copa Libertadores games for Independiente Medellín in 2009, before signing with FC Dallas of Major League Soccer on 22 July.

Since joining Dallas Benítez has been a key contributor, helping the club to reach the 2010 MLS Cup final.

International 

Benítez is a full international with the Colombia national football team, and was part of the Colombian squads at the 2005 CONCACAF Gold Cup and the 2007 Copa América.

Personal
Benítez holds a U.S. green card which qualifies him as a domestic player for MLS roster purposes.

Honours

FC Dallas 

 Major League Soccer Western Conference Championship (1): 2010

References

External links 
 
 

1979 births
Living people
Sportspeople from Valle del Cauca Department
Colombian footballers
Colombia international footballers
Colombian expatriate footballers
Envigado F.C. players
Independiente Santa Fe footballers
Independiente Medellín footballers
Deportivo Pereira footballers
Club Atlético Colón footballers
Deportivo Cali footballers
FC Dallas players
Categoría Primera A players
Argentine Primera División players
Major League Soccer players
2005 CONCACAF Gold Cup players
2007 Copa América players
Expatriate footballers in Argentina
Expatriate soccer players in the United States
Association football defenders